The Defence of the Realm Act 1803 (43 Geo. 3 c. 55) was an Act of the Parliament of the United Kingdom. The Act was bought before the House of Commons on 18 May 1803 by Charles Philip Yorke, then Secretary at War in the Addington ministry. The Act required all counties to a full report on all able-bodied men aged between fifteen and sixty, classifying those in the volunteer regiments, those willing to serve, to drive waggons or act as guides, as well as the details of waggons, boats, horses, cattle, food and forage.

Notes

United Kingdom Acts of Parliament 1803
19th-century military history of the United Kingdom
United Kingdom military law
Repealed United Kingdom Acts of Parliament
British defence policymaking
Military human resource management
Napoleonic Wars
1803 in international relations